The academic Strike for Black Lives and #ShutDownSTEM day were a mass shutdown of academia that took place around the world on June 10, 2020. The main goals of the strike and the shut down were to reflect upon anti-Black racism in academia and STEM and to commit to actions to eradicate it.

History 
In the wake of the unjust killings and police brutality toward Black people in the United States, Black researchers shared their personal stories and experiences of racism within the scientific community. This inspired group of researchers called for the academic community to reflect upon their role in contributing to racism and discrimination. In particular, the organisers called for the majority white academic community to consider their personal roles in perpetuating systemic racism. The day was organised by Particles for Justice and Vanguard STEM, an intersectional coalition of scientists and STEM professionals. On June 5, 2020, the coalition simultaneously launched separate written calls for a strike and shutdown at strikeforblacklives.com and shutdownstem.com, which provided resources and information about the day and its aims.

As part of the #ShutDownSTEM and #StrikeforBlackLives activities, researchers around the world were encouraged to stop usual academic work for a day: to read and engage with resources that challenge them, take responsibility to be anti-racist, and to create space for people who experience racism to be able to heal. In the build up to the event, Particles for Justice released a statement saying,"We recognize that our academic institutions and research collaborations—despite big talk about diversity, equity, and inclusion—have ultimately failed Black people." Organisers of #ShutDownSTEM included Brittany Kamai, Lucianne Walkowicz, Jedidah Isler, Renée Hložek, and others. The Particles for Justice organisers of Strike for Black Lives were Brian Nord, Chanda Prescod-Weinstein, Matthew Buckley, Kyle Cranmer, Djuna Croon, Daniel Harlow, Seyda Ipek, Sam McDermott, Matthew Reece, Nausheen R. Shah, Brian Shuve, Tracy Slatyer, Timothy M.P. Tait, Graham White, and Tien-Tien Yu.

Impact 
As part of the launch of the Strike for Black Lives, the organisers asked people to make a public commitment to participation. When they launched on June 5 over 100 distinguished particle physicists and cosmologists committed to participation. On June 10, thousands of academics, professional bodies, and institutions came together to take part in what was identified on social media and in the press as #ShutDownSTEM, #Strike4BlackLives, or the Strike for Black Lives.

Participating organisations 
 Nature Research
 University of Chicago
 Woods Hole Oceanographic Institution
 Massachusetts Institute of Technology
 ArXiv
 American Physical Society
 American Association for the Advancement of Science
 Arizona State University
 Institute of Physics
 Rockefeller University
 The Optical Society
 Software Underground
 University at Buffalo
 Boston University
 Society of Women Engineers
 The Earth Institute
 Harvard University

See also 
 Social impact of the COVID-19 pandemic in the United States
 Strikes during the COVID-19 pandemic

References

External links 
 Shutdown STEM 
 Strike For Black Lives Official website

2020 protests
George Floyd protests
June 2020 events in the United States
Post–civil rights era in African-American history